William Aislabie may refer to:

William Aislabie (governor) (died 1725), governor of Bombay, 1708–1715
William Aislabie (1700–1781), Member of Parliament for Ripon, 1721–1781
William Aislabie (1671–1725), his uncle, also Member of Parliament for Ripon, 1719–1722
William Aislabie (died 1773), cousin of William Aislabie (1700–1781), also Member of Parliament for Ripon, 1727–1734